Henry Cromwell, 2nd Baron Cromwell (before 1 March 1538 – 20 November 1592), the son of Gregory Cromwell, 1st Baron Cromwell and Elizabeth Seymour, was an English peer during the reign of Elizabeth I. He was the grandson of Henry VIII's chief minister, Thomas Cromwell, 1st earl of Essex, nephew of the Protector Somerset and first cousin of Edward VI.

Family
Henry Cromwell was the eldest son of Gregory Cromwell, 1st baron Cromwell, only son and heir of Thomas Cromwell, and Elizabeth, widow of Sir Anthony Ughtred (d. 1534), daughter of Sir John Seymour of Wolf Hall, Wiltshire, and Margery Wentworth. He was baptised on 1 March 1538, probably at Hampton Court, where the Lady Mary almost certainly stood as godmother. Shortly after the baptism, his parents left for Lewes in Sussex to the former Cluniac Priory of St. Pancras, recently acquired by his grandfather, where they remained from March 1538 until early 1539, when they took up residence in Leeds Castle, Kent.

Henry's grandfather, Thomas Cromwell, had been created Baron Cromwell of Wimbledon in 1536 and Earl of Essex in 1540 as a reward for his service as chief minister to Henry VIII, but he had lost those titles by attainder in June 1540. On 18 December 1540, his son Gregory was created 1st Baron Cromwell. This title was a new creation rather than a restoration of his father's forfeited barony. Henry succeeded his father as the second Baron Cromwell under that creation. A minor at his father's premature death from sweating sickness on 4 July 1551, he was first summoned to Parliament in 1563.

His mother remarried, in 1554, Sir John Paulet, later Lord St John. She died 19 March 1568, and was buried 5 April at Basing, Hampshire. His stepfather later married, before 30 September 1568, Winifred, widow of Sir Richard Sackville, and daughter of John Brydges, a former Lord Mayor of London. He succeeded his father as Marquess of Winchester in 1572.

Cromwell was educated at St John's College, Cambridge, where he matriculated in 1553. He may have been admitted to Lincoln's Inn, 7 March 1557. His siblings included brother Thomas Cromwell and half-brother Sir Henry Ughtred, and his brother-in-law was William Paulet, later 3rd Marquess of Winchester.

He was arrested in 1572 for contempt of court (an injunction in the Court of Chancery) but the House of Lords insisted on his release since as a peer he was immune from arrest in civil actions.

Marriage and issue
Cromwell married, before 1560, Mary ( – 10 October 1592), the daughter of his stepfather John Paulet, 2nd Marquess of Winchester and his first wife Elizabeth Willoughby, and by her had issue: 
 Edward Cromwell, 3rd Baron Cromwell, ( – 27 April 1607), married firstly, Elizabeth Upton (died 1592/3), of Puslinch, Devon by whom he had a daughter, Elizabeth and secondly, Frances Rugge, (d. 1631) of Felmingham, Norfolk, by whom he had a son, Thomas Cromwell, 1st Earl of Ardglass and two daughters, Frances and Anne. He served with the Earl of Essex in the expedition against Spain and was knighted by him in Dublin on 12 July 1599.
 Sir Gregory Cromwell, married Frances, daughter of Sir Edward Griffin of Dingley, Northamptonshire. He was knighted by James I at Belvoir Castle 23 April 1603. 
 Katharine Cromwell (d. 24 March 1621), married on 10 February 1581 at North Elmham, Norfolk, Sir Lionel Tollemache, 1st Baronet, of Helmingham, Suffolk (before 14 December 1562 – 1612), son of Sir Lionel Tollemache and Susan Jermyn. They had a son, Sir Lionel Tollemache, 2nd Baronet.

Death
Cromwell's wife died at North Elmham, Norfolk, 10 October 1592, and was buried, on 23 October, at Launde Abbey Leicestershire. He died on 20 November following at North Elmham, Norfolk and was buried, 4 December, in the chapel at Launde Abbey, Launde, Leicestershire.

References

Bibliography
 
 
 

  at HathiTrust
  at HathiTrust

External links 
 
 Extracts from the Will of Henry Lord Cromwell
 The Priory of St. Pancras, Lewes

1538 births
1592 deaths
Alumni of St John's College, Cambridge
People from Lewes
16th-century English nobility
Henry
Seymour family
People from North Elmham
Barons Cromwell